Bazar Mahalleh may refer to:
 Bazar Mahalleh, Gilan
 Bazar Mahalleh, Mazandaran